Rock 'N' Oz is the first greatest hits compilation of the Spanish folk metal band Mägo de Oz. It also comes with a special edition entitled The Best Oz which includes an extra disc containing rare recordings as well as a DVD highlighting their American tour.

The album also has four rerecorded songs: "Molinos de viento", "Jesús de Chamberí", "El Cantar de la Luna Oscura", and "Hasta que tu muerte nos separe". The band also announced that they would be signing copies of the album throughout multiple locations in Spain.

Controversy

Chilean songwriter Fernando Ubiergo claimed that the band's leader (Txus di Fellatio) recorded one of their songs without copyright permission, and credited to Txus. The band apologized and told the media it was a print-mistake.

Tracks

Disc 1
 Molinos de viento (Version 2006)
 La Costa del Silencio
 Fiesta Pagana
 La Danza del Fuego
 El Lago
 El Atrapasueños
 La Rosa de los Vientos
 El Que Quiera Entender Que Entienda
 Hoy Toca Ser Feliz
 La Posada de los Muertos
 Diabulus in Música
 Hasta Que Tu Muerte Nos Separe (Version 2006)
 Hasta Que el Cuerpo Aguante
 El Cantar de la Luna Oscura (Version 2006)
Disc 2
 Jesús De Chamberí (Version 2006)
 Van A Rodar Cabezas
 El Santo Grial
 Satania
 La Leyenda De La Mancha
 Gaia
 Maritormes
 El Paseo De Los Tristes
 Astaroth
 Réquiem
Disc 3 (only on The Best Oz version)
 Noches de Bohemia (New song)
 Para Ella (old recording sung by Juanma, adapted from Cuando Agosto era 21 by Fernando Ubiergo)
 Brisa de Otoño (old recording sung by Juanma)
 Por Volver a Tenerte (old recording sung by Juanma)
 El Tango del Donante
 Domingo de Gramos (old recording sung by Juanma)
 Jesús de Chamberí (sung in 1995 by Juanma just before the recording of the album and his firing)
 El Ángel Caído (demo)
 La Canción de Pedro (demo)
 Al-Mejandría (demo)
 Memoria da Noite (cover)
 Sueños Diabólicos (instrumental)
 La Fina
 Take on Me (cover)
 Como un Huracán (cover)
 Adiós Dulcinea (First released on the Txus Di Fellatio's poetry book-cd "El Cementerio de los Versos Perdidos" as an inedit track)

References 
 Terranoticias 

Mägo de Oz albums
2006 compilation albums
Locomotive Music compilation albums